John Wilkinson (September 30, 1798 - September 19, 1862) was a lawyer and first Postmaster of community known as Bogardus Corners, Cossit's Corners and Salina in Central New York. As a young man, Wilkinson took inspiration from a poem about an ancient city and named the new village, Syracuse just in time for the opening of the Erie Canal. Wilkinson was a prominent citizen in Syracuse and was an original town planner and helped lay out and name the village streets. He also served as an assemblyman and founded the Syracuse Bank in 1838.

John Wilkinson died in Syracuse on September 19, 1862, at age 63.

References

External links 
 Uniquely Syracuse, City of Syracuse, 2009

1798 births
1862 deaths
Politicians from Syracuse, New York
People from Troy, New York
Burials at Oakwood Cemetery (Syracuse, New York)